St Vincents is a Gaelic Athletic Association club based in Marino, on the northside of Dublin, Ireland. The club was founded in 1931 in Marino, instrumental in the founding of the club were Rev Dr William Fitzpatrick (St Vincent de Paul Church, Marino) and Bro. Ernest Fitzgerald (Scoil Mhuire CBS, Marino). Although its club grounds were in Raheny for a number of years, it moved to its home back into Marino in 1987. St Vincents merged with Marino Camogie Club in 1997 to form the St. Vincents Hurling, Football and Camogie Club. They have won the All-Ireland Senior Club Football Championship on three occasions, most recently in 2014. They are the most successful side in the Dublin Senior Football championship having won the title 29 times. The club has also won 14 Dublin Senior 1 camogie titles (6 as Marino) and completed a three in a row in 2015–2017.

Playing Grounds
As well as using their own pitches at their clubhouse and Páirc Naomh Uinsionn, the club uses pitches beside them at Ardscoil Ris (where facilities were redeveloped in 2020 in association with St. Vincents), the pitch at Marino Institute of Education adjacent to the club, in Fairview Park, and also in St Anne's Park. In 2019, a 4G all-weather GAA pitch was installed.

The club grounds in Marino were developed largely on what was part of the walled garden of Lord Charlemont's (who named the area Marino) estate, which had become Christian Brothers' St. Mary's Teacher training college (Colaiste Mhuire/Marino Institute) grounds and the O'Brien Institute. Part of the walls of the garden can still be seen to the south and east (Casino Park) borders of the club grounds. A logo of Marino Casino and part of the Charlemont family motto (Ferro Comitante), the full motto is Deo Duce, Ferro Comitante (God as my leader, my sword my companion), are embossed on the club's crest.

Honours

Football
Vincents have won the Dublin Senior Football Championship 29 times. Their nearest rivals are O'Tooles who have won the Dublin Championship on 11 occasions. St Vincents won in the years 1949, 1950, 1951, 1952, 1953, 1954, 1955, 1957, 1958, 1959, 1960, 1961, 1962, 1964, 1966, 1967, 1970, 1971, 1972, 1975, 1976, 1977, 1981, 1984, 2007, 2013, 2014, 2016, 2017.

The club have a 7 in a row and a 6 in a row in the Dublin Senior Championship and two 3-in-a-row runs.

A remarkable 7 in a row which would have led to 14 in a row was stopped by Erins Hope in 1956 and yet another 7 in a row was stopped in 1963 by UCD.

They have also won Leinster football titles in 1972, 1975, 1984, 2007, 2013, 2014 and 2016, 
St Vincents highest accolades to date were their three All-Ireland Senior Club Football Championship titles in 1976, 2008 and 2014. In the 1976 decider they defeated Roscommon Gaels by 4–10 to 0–05 and in 2008 they overcame Nemo Rangers by 1–11 to 0–13 in the final at Croke Park
In 2014 the club won its third All-Ireland title having defeated a gallant Castlebar Mitchels side by a scoreline of 4–12 to 2–11.

In 1991, St Vincents had the unique distinction of winning the Intermediate and Junior Football Championship.
St Vincents are also the most successful club in the Dublin Minor Football Championship. They have won the competition on twenty three occasions in 1994, 1987, 1986, 1983, 1982, 1981, 1980, 1979, 1978, 1971, 1970, 1959, 1958, 1956, 1955, 1950, 1948, 1947, 1946, 1945, 1943, 1942 and 1936. This is a record that is unlikely to be rivalled for many years despite Vincents not winning a title since 1994, as their closest rivals Na Fianna have only won seven titles.

St Vincents also captured a remarkable double double in 1993/94 capturing the U21 Football & Hurling Championships two years in a row.

List of football honours
 All-Ireland Senior Club Football Championship: 1975-76, 2007–08, 2013–14
 Leinster Senior Club Football Championship: 1972-73, 1975–76, 1984–85, 2007–08, 2013–14, 2014–15, 2016–17
 Dublin Senior Football Championship: 1949, 1950, 1951, 1952, 1953, 1954, 1955, 1957, 1958, 1959, 1960, 1961, 1962, 1964, 1966, 1967, 1970, 1971, 1972, 1975, 1976, 1977, 1981, 1984, 2007, 2013, 2014, 2016, 2017
 Dublin Senior Football League: 2015, 2018
 Dublin Intermediate Football Championship: 1953, 1977, 1991, 2015
 Dublin Junior Football Championship: 1976, 1984, 1991, 1995, 1997, 2014
 Dublin Junior C Football Championship: 2006,2010, 2016
 Dublin Under 21 Football Championship: 1973, 1978, 1980, 1982, 1984, 1993, 1994, 2004
 Dublin Minor A Football Championship: 1936, 1942, 1943, 1945, 1946, 1947, 1948, 1950, 1955, 1956, 1958, 1959, 1970, 1971, 1978, 1979, 1980, 1981, 1982, 1983, 1986, 1987, 1994
 Dublin Minor B Football Championship: 2017
 Dublin AFL Div. 5: 2014
 Dublin AFL Div. 6: 2013

Hurling
Although St Vincents are more renowned for their football exploits, they have been very successful as a senior hurling side.  St Vincents have won the Dublin Senior Hurling Championship 13 times (second in the roll of honour behind Faughs), collecting the title in the years 1953, 1954, 1955, 1957, 1960, 1962, 1964, 1967, 1975, 1981, 1982, 1988 and 1993. St Vincents competed in the 2007 and 2010 Dublin Senior Hurling Championship finals but lost to Ballyboden St Endas on both occasions. St Vincents are the most successful club in the history of the Dublin Minor Hurling Championship. They have won the A competition on twenty occasions, most recently in 2002.

List of hurling honours
 Dublin Senior Hurling Championship: 1953, 1954. 1955, 1957, 1960, 1962, 1964, 1967, 1975, 1981, 1982, 1988, 1993
 Dublin Intermediate Hurling Championship: 1953, 1981, 1984, 1988, 1998, 2000, 2003, 2008, 2014
 Dublin Junior Hurling Championship: 1943, 1948, 1957, 1980, 1990, 2006
 Dublin Junior B Hurling Championship: 2016, 2019
 Dublin Junior C Hurling Championship: 2010
 Dublin Under 21 Hurling Championship: 1967, 1971, 1978, 1979, 1980, 1983, 1993, 1994
 Dublin Minor A Hurling Championship: 1936, 1943, 1944, 1945, 1946, 1947, 1948, 1949, 1950, 1951, 1955, 1957, 1961, 1962, 1966, 1971, 1978, 1979, 1982, 1988, 1990, 1991, 2002
 Dublin Minor C Hurling Championship: 2009
 Dublin Minor D Hurling Championship: 2009, 2015

Camogie

List of camogie honours
 Dublin Senior 1 Championship:  1990, 1992, 1993, 1994, 1995, 1996, 1998, 2005, 2007, 2015, 2016, 2017, 2019, 2022
 Dublin Senior 2 Championship:  2010
 Dublin Senior 5 Championship:  1983, 2005, 2014
 Leinster Senior Championship:  1998, 2019, 2022

Notable players

Football
Michael Savage
Ger Brennan
Diarmuid Connolly
Eamonn Fennell
Tomás Quinn
David O'Gorman
Shane Carthy 
Des Ferguson
Des Foley
Jackie Gilroy
Pat Gilroy
Tony Hanahoe
Kevin Heffernan
Jimmy Keaveney
Brian Mullins
Nathan Mullins
Gay O'Driscoll
Bobby Doyle
Pat Canavan
Tommy Conroy

Hurling
 Des Foley
 Lar Foley
 Kevin Heffernan
 Damien Russell
 Rónán Fallon
 Diarmuid Connolly
 Tomás McGrane
 Des Ferguson
 Noel Drumgoole

See also
Dublin GAA
Dublin Senior Football Championship

References

External links
St Vincents Official Website
Official Dublin GAA Website
Dublin Club GAA

Gaelic games clubs in Dublin (city)
Gaelic football clubs in Dublin (city)
Hurling clubs in Dublin (city)